Austin & Ally is a Disney Channel soundtrack from the hit TV series Austin & Ally. The album features songs from the show's first season performed by Ross Lynch with two bonus tracks performed by the band R5. It was released digitally and physically by Walt Disney Records on September 11, 2012.

Background and release
During a commercial for the single "Heard It on the Radio", Ross Lynch announced that a soundtrack for the show was on its way. The track list was revealed on July 20, 2012.
 On August 6, 2012, the soundtrack cover was revealed by the magazine BOP and Tiger Beat. On the week of September 3, 2012, Radio Disney Planet Premiered songs from the album. Candice and Ross 'took over' the radio station every night at 8PM ET for one hour until September 7, 2012.

Charts and chart performance
The soundtrack peaked at #27 on the Billboard 200. It also debuted at #1 on the iTunes Soundtrack chart and remained there for four weeks.

Track listing

Charts

Weekly charts

Year-end charts

References

External links
 
 

Ross Lynch albums
2012 soundtrack albums
Pop rock soundtracks
Walt Disney Records soundtracks